Dostoevskij (sometimes Dostoevskii) is a crater on Mercury. It has a diameter of 430 kilometers. Its name was adopted by the International Astronomical Union in 1979. Dostoevskij is named for the Russian novelist Fyodor Dostoyevsky, who lived from 1821 to 1881.

References

External links

Impact craters on Mercury
Fyodor Dostoyevsky